David Craig Peacock (born 30 January 1970) is a Scottish international lawn and indoor bowler.

Bowls career
Peacock won the 2002 Hong Kong International Bowls Classic singles title.

He claimed the triples gold medal at the 2004 World Outdoor Bowls Championship with Jim McIntyre and Willie Wood. Four years later he repeated the success when winning the triples at the 2008 World Outdoor Bowls Championship with Wayne Hogg and Willie Wood.

In 2011 he won the pairs bronze medal at the Atlantic Bowls Championships. The following year he won his third World Championship gold in the triples at the 2012 World Outdoor Bowls Championship with Graeme Archer and Darren Burnett, he also won a fours bronze medal.

He competed for Scotland in the men's fours at the 2014 Commonwealth Games where he won a gold medal.

References

1970 births
Living people
Bowls players at the 2010 Commonwealth Games
Bowls players at the 2014 Commonwealth Games
Commonwealth Games gold medallists for Scotland
Scottish male bowls players
Sportspeople from Edinburgh
Commonwealth Games medallists in lawn bowls
Bowls World Champions
Bowls European Champions
Medallists at the 2014 Commonwealth Games